1st Filmfare Awards East ceremony, presented by the Filmfare Magazine, honoured the best Bengali language Indian films of 2013. The ceremony was held on 29 March 2014.

Winners and nominees 
The nominees for the 1st Filmfare Awards East were announced on 21 March 2014. The winners are listed first and highlighted in boldface.

Main awards

Global East People's Choice Filmfare Award

Bengali cinema

Assamese cinema

Odia cinema

Critics' and technical awards

Special awards

Multiple nominations 
The following films received multiple nominations.
 6 nominations: Alik Sukh
 5 nominations: Mishawr Rawhoshyo, Phoring, Shobdo, Meghe Dhaka Tara, Maach Mishti & More, Goynar Baksho
 4 nominations: Boss
 3 nominations: Chander Pahar, Rupkatha Noy, Hawa Bodol
 2 nominations: Proloy, Nayika Sangbad, Aborto

Multiple awards 
The following films received multiple awards.
 3 Wins: Alik Sukh, Shobdo, Rupkatha Noy, Goynar Baksho, Phoring, Boss

References

Filmfare Awards
2014 film awards
2014 in India
Events of The Times Group